Violent Things is the fourth studio album by American rock band The Brobecks. It was released on May 18, 2009.

Background
Violent Things was written by Dallon Weekes and recorded by producer Casey Crescenzo in his home basement studio in Boston, MA over a period of two weeks. It features Darren Robinson of Phantom Planet on guitar. In an online interview, Weekes stated that though mostly satisfied with 'Violent Things', the record was never mixed or mastered, and that due to a lack of resources to complete the recording, the record was released as 'unfinished'.

In 2011, Weekes personally re-recorded "Visitation of the Ghost" in a studio in southern California. He disclosed that he decided to do so since he was "never fully happy with the version" in the official album. This alternative version of "Visitation of the Ghost" was released on Bandcamp in the same year as an anniversary bonus.

Track listing

Personnel
Dallon Weekes – lead vocals, bass, guitar, keyboards
Drew Davidson – drums
Casey Crescenzo – guitar, piano

References 

2009 albums